Siebenhengste-Hohgant-Höhle is a cave located in Switzerland, in the Canton of Bern north of Lake Thun, between the villages of Eriz and Habkern. The cave network formed in the Urgonian Limestone Formation (Aptian age).

The cave was first explored in 1966 by the Club Jurassien, a speleology club from La Chaux-de-Fonds in the canton of Neuchâtel, Switzerland, when three of its 42 entrances were discovered. Explorations were later undertaken by many different regional caving clubs.

In 2019, it was the world's 12th longest cave, with a 164.5 km development. It is also the world's 26th deepest cave at 1,340 m deep.

See also
 Hohgant (F1 and K2 caves)
 Sieben Hengste
 List of longest caves

Bibliography

References

External links
 General map of the underground network
 Höhlenforschergemeinschaft Region Hoghant (Hoghant Region Cavers Community)
 Club Jurassien (in French)

Caves of Switzerland